Stellar West is an American indie punk band from Naperville, Illinois, United States, formed in 2014. The group consists of Parker Belonio (vocals, guitar), Cole Onley (bass guitar), Levi Hansen (Guitar) and JC Kuppinger (drums). Their debut release, the EP Songs From the Basement, was released on October 22, 2015 and their first album, Unfiltered, was released on November 13, 2016. Both the EP and LP were produced by Adam Krier and engineered by Andy Gerber at Million Yen Studios. Pre-production was done at Sound Summit with Adam Krier and Charlie Dresser. Their EP Kermit the Fraud was produced and engineered at Sound Summit Studios in Naperville. On September 27, 2020, they released Penny. Penny is a single off of MORTAL WOMBAT, their sophomore LP which drops October 10, 2020. This LP was also produced and engineered at Sound Summit.

History
Stellar West (formerly Stellar) formed in May 2014 after the trio met at a School of Rock in their hometown, not unlike other up and coming young bands, Hippo Campus and Doll Skin who got the same start. Just over a year after their formation, they released their debut EP, Songs From the Basement, digitally and on CD. At the end of 2015, the band was recognized by Forkster Promotions by winning three categories in the website's year-end music awards, including placing 50 out of the top 100 new artists of the year.

January 2016 saw the band being invited to perform live on WGN Morning News, where they performed their song "Interference" and a cover of Nirvana's "Smells Like Teen Spirit". In mid-2016, the band won a contest through the music festival Riot Fest and were invited to perform at the event later that year.

Stellar West's first album, Unfiltered, was released at the end of 2016. Following its release, the band was included in Alternative Press's list of the best bands under 21.

In April 2017, the band was chosen as a top Chicago finalist to open for Metallica on a five city tour.

Discography

EPs
Songs From the Basement (2015)
Kermit the Fraud (2019)

Albums
Unfiltered (2016)
MORTAL WOMBAT (OCT 2020)

Band members

Current members
  Parker Belonio – vocals, guitar
  Cole Onley – bass guitar
  Levi Hansen – guitar
  JC Kuppinger - drums

See also

 List of alternative rock artists
 List of punk rock bands, L–Z

References

External links
 Official website
 Spotify
 YouTube Channel
 Bandcamp Profile
 Soundcloud

2014 establishments in Illinois
Alternative rock groups from Illinois
Punk rock groups from Illinois
American grunge groups
Musical groups established in 2014
American musical trios